Divide is an unincorporated town, a post office, and a census-designated place (CDP) located in and governed by Teller County, Colorado, United States. The CDP is a part of the Colorado Springs, CO Metropolitan Statistical Area. The Divide post office has the ZIP Code 80814. At the United States Census 2010, the population of the Divide CDP was 127, while the population of the 80814 ZIP Code Tabulation Area was 4,023 including adjacent areas.

History
The Divide Post Office has been in operation since 1889. The town was named for Ute Pass between the Arkansas River watershed and the Missouri River watershed.

Geography
Divide sits on the north slope of Pikes Peak. Ute Pass is immediately west of town. Divide is located at the western intersection of U.S. Highway 24 and State Highway 67 (The highways overlap east to Woodland Park).

Demographics

See also

Outline of Colorado
Index of Colorado-related articles
State of Colorado
Colorado cities and towns
Colorado census designated places
Colorado counties
Teller County, Colorado
Colorado metropolitan areas
Front Range Urban Corridor
South Central Colorado Urban Area
Colorado Springs, CO Metropolitan Statistical Area

References

External links

Divide @ Colorado.com
Divide @ UncoverColorado.com
Divide @ TellerLinks.com
Divide Chamber of Commerce
Divide Fire Protection District
Teller County website

Census-designated places in Teller County, Colorado
Census-designated places in Colorado